Limbang Airport  is an airport serving the town of Limbang, in the state of Sarawak in Malaysia. The airport opened on the 15 July 2004, and is capable of handling 250,000 passengers per year. It is able to handle large turboprop aircraft such as the Fokker F50 and the ATR 72-500.

History
The old Limbang STOL (Short Take Off and Landing) airfield was built in 1963 by the British Army for use during the confrontation between Malaysia and Indonesia. The old airfield did not meet the safety requirements of ICAO (International Civil Aviation Organization). Furthermore, the old airfield was surrounded by mountains and the approach path was covered by tall vegetation such as trees, combined with the relatively high ground. This makes it particularly hazardous and difficult for civilian aircraft to operate safely into and out of the airfield.

In 1978, a consultant firm was appointed to select a new site for a completely new airport and thus proceeded with the Master Plan Study regarding the layout of the new airport. The development plan of the new airport back then is to accommodate the Fokker F27 turboprop aircraft operation in the beginning and thereafter Boeing 737-200 jet aircraft operation.

After lengthy delays, the new Limbang Airport project started in the year 2000 and was completed in only four years. The airport was officially opened on 7 April 2004, and full operational use followed on 15 April 2004.

Currently, Malaysia Airlines' subsidiary MASWings operates into and out of the airport. Other operators include Medevac and logging helicopters, and private turboprop powered aircraft. Previous users of the airport were Malaysia Airlines and former Air Asia subsidiary FAX (Fly Asian Express).

Airlines and destinations

Traffic and statistics

References

External links
 Limbang Airport at Malaysia Airports Holdings Berhad
 

Airports in Sarawak
Limbang District